Following is a list of teams on the 2016–17 World Curling Tour, which was part of the 2016-17 curling season. Only the skips of the teams are listed.

Men
Updated December 22, 2016

Women
Updated December 21, 2016

References
Men's teams
Women's teams

Teams
2016 in curling
2017 in curling
World Curling Tour teams